Phuntsholing, also spelled as Phuentsholing, is a border town in southern Bhutan and is the administrative seat of Chukha District. The town occupies parts of both Phuentsholing Gewog and Sampheling Gewog.

Phuentsholing adjoins the Indian town of Jaigaon, and cross-border trade has resulted in a thriving local economy. The town had the headquarters of the Bank of Bhutan previously but shifted to Thimphu. In 2017, Phuentsholing had a population of 27,658.

History
On 5 April 1964, reformist Prime Minister Jigme Dorji was assassinated in Phuntsholing by monarchist cadres as the king lay ill in Switzerland. The Dorji family was subsequently put under close watch. It was 1958 when the first one-storeyed cottage was constructed to house a shop. The late Prime Minister, Jigme Dorji informed Phuentsholing residents that concrete houses could be constructed.
Tashi group of companies constructed the first concrete house, followed by Tibetans and Indians.  Some of the structures that exist to this day are the buildings housing Bhutan Enterprise, Jatan Prasad Lal Chand Prasad shop and a beauty parlour near Zantdopelri lhakhang. After the announcement, 18 shops were built around Zangdopelri area. The Zangdopelri area was a bus terminal, and on Saturday a market would be assembled. Apart from the cottages, there were several huts and Phuentsholing was beginning to grow.

Geography

Climate
Phuntsholing has a sultry tropical monsoon climate, strongly influenced by the South Asian monsoon. Summers are long, muggy and very rainy, while winters are short, very mild and dry. This climate is described by the Köppen climate classification as Am.

Architecture and culture
The India-Bhutan border at Phuntsholing clearly separates two very different peoples and cultures. Jaigaon across the border is larger, bustling and loud, similar to many other West Bengal centres of commerce, albeit with many Bhutanese shoppers. Phuntsholing is uniquely more urban than other Bhutanese towns as it is the Bhutan financial, industrial and trading capital. It has been affected a little by the neighbouring culture, but is distinctly far more quiet and orderly than its neighbour.

Economy
The majority of goods traded into Bhutan transit through Phuntsholing, making the town the gateway to Bhutan for trade with India. The border with China is closed.

Indian border crossing

The border is separated by a long wall with a single Bhutanese gate. Locals can sometimes even cross without being asked for papers. Tourists from India, Bangladesh and Maldives do not need visa to enter Bhutan but have to show proof of identity such as a passport or voter ID card and apply for a permit at Phuntsholing to enter Bhutan. Other foreigners need a visa presented by a hired registered tour guide. The entry gate into the town is manned by the Sashastra Seema Bal and Bhutanese Army guards. The terrain inclines soon after the gate.

Transportation

The town does not have an airport facilities or railway but Indian Railways has railway stations nearby. A  railway track has been planned from the nearest railway stone
Hashimara in North Bengal to Phuntsholing.

Siliguri is the nearest large city in India. New Jalpaiguri and New Alipurduar are the nearest large railway junctions. Buses are available from the towns in North Bengal. Buses are operated by both Indian based companies and Bhutanese government. Once at Phuntsholing, the Lateral Road gives travelers access to the rest of Bhutan.

From almost anywhere in the city, one can see the road to Thimphu snaking up the hillside, and in the evening it is easy to see the headlights of distant vehicles heading towards the capital. Opposite the big ground PSA is the road that connects the rest of the cities of Bhutan.

See also
Tourism in Bhutan
Transport in Bhutan
Bhutan-India Border
Püncogling Township

References

External links

 'Himalayas' Sentry', Travelogue in The Indian Express, 21-09-08, by Arjun Razdan

Populated places in Bhutan
Bhutan–India border crossings
Chukha District
Twin cities
Divided cities